Solar Opposites is an American adult animated sitcom created by Rick and Morty co-creator Justin Roiland and Mike McMahan for Hulu. The series premiered on May 8, 2020.

 In June 2021, the series was renewed for a fourth season consisting of 12 episodes.

Series overview

Episodes

Season 1 (2020)

Season 2 (2021)

Christmas Special (2021)

Season 3 (2022)

Halloween Special (2022)

References

External links
 

Lists of American adult animated television series episodes
Lists of American sitcom episodes
Lists of American science fiction television series episodes